The United States Senate election of 1926 in New York was held on November 2, 1926. Incumbent Republican Senator James Wolcott Wadsworth Jr. ran for re-election to a third term, but was defeated by Democrat Robert F. Wagner.

Republican convention

Candidates
 Franklin W. Cristman, State Senator
 James Wolcott Wadsworth Jr., incumbent Senator

Campaign
Incumbent Senator Wadsworth was opposed by hard-line prohibitionists, who instead supported Franklin W. Cristman at the Republican Convention.

Results

Democratic nomination

Candidates
 Robert F. Wagner, New York Supreme Court Justice and former State Senator

General election

Candidates
 Joseph Brandon (Socialist Labor)
 Franklin W. Cristman, State Senator (Independent Republican)
 William F. Dunne, editor of the Butte Bulletin (Workers)
 James Wolcott Wadsworth Jr., incumbent Senator (Republican)
 Robert F. Wagner, New York Supreme Court Justice and former State Senator (Democratic)
 Jessie Wallace Hughan, radical pacifist and activist (Socialist)

After failing to qualify for a primary election against Senator Wadsworth, Cristman announced his campaign as an independent Republican. He supported Prohibition and was opposed to Wadsworth's position as a "wet" (or anti-Prohibition) Republican.

Results

References

1926
New York
1926 New York (state) elections